Alberto Iniesta Jiménez (4 January 1923 – 3 January 2016) was a Spanish prelate of the Catholic Church.

Iniesta Jiménez was born in Albacete and ordained a priest on 13 July 1958. He was appointed titular bishop of the Tubernuca as well as auxiliary archbishop of the Archdiocese of Madrid on 5 September 1972. He was ordained a bishop on 22 October 1972. Iniesta Jiménez retired as auxiliary archbishop on 5 April 1998.

External links
Catholic-Hierarchy
Madrid Archdiocese (Spanish)

20th-century Roman Catholic bishops in Spain
21st-century Roman Catholic bishops in Spain
Spanish Roman Catholic titular bishops
1923 births
2016 deaths